Robert William "Robbie" Fulks (born March 25, 1963) is an American alternative country singer-songwriter, instrumentalist and long-time Chicago, Illinois resident. He has released 13 albums over a career spanning more than 30 years. His 2016 record Upland Stories was nominated for a Grammy for Best Folk Album and the song "Alabama at Night" was nominated for a Grammy for Best American Roots Song.

Early life 
Fulks was born in York, Pennsylvania, the son of a school teacher father. He grew up in small towns in southeastern Pennsylvania, the Blue Ridge Mountains area of Virginia, and the Piedmont region of North Carolina. Fulks' family moved often when he was young, until they eventually settled in North Carolina when he was 12. Fulks considers North Carolina his childhood home. Fulks has a younger brother named Jubal.

Fulks was exposed to music through his family, where everyone played a different instrument, from his Aunt Stella on banjo, his Aunt Mildred on violin, and his mother on autoharp to his father playing guitar. Through this immersion, Fulks picked up his aunt's banjo when he was six and started playing guitar at age 11.

In 1980, he graduated from Carolina Friends School. In 1980 at the age of 17, Fulks moved to New York City and attended Columbia College, Columbia University, with the class of 1984.

Career 
While at Columbia University, Fulks often played at Gerdes Folk City and other places in Greenwich Village. He also performed on campus in places such as the Postcrypt Coffeehouse. He eventually dropped out of college after two years to pursue music full time.

Chicago 
Fulks moved to Chicago in 1983, and shortly after started teaching at Chicago's Old Town School of Folk Music. In 1987, he joined The Special Consensus Bluegrass Band, where he showcased his unique guitar flatpicking. In the early 1990s, he performed in the musical Woody Guthrie's American Song.

Meanwhile, he recorded his original compositions. Steve Albini engineered many of his early tracks, and the Chicago punk-country label Bloodshot Records began releasing them in 1993.

Nashville 
While living in Chicago, Fulks worked for four years as a country songwriter, mainly for Music Row publisher API.

Fulks's solo debut, Country Love Songs, was released on Bloodshot Records in 1996 to positive reviews. The album was engineered by Steve Albini. The Skeletons, members of whom later formed the band The Morells, played on much of the record. Tom Brumley and Buck Owens are also featured. It was followed by 1997's South Mouth, which cemented Fulks's retro-alternative image.

As fans had grown used to his rough and sparse sound, many were shocked by the release of Fulks's third album, 1998's Let's Kill Saturday Night, on Geffen Records. Fulks recorded it during the spring of 1998 in Nashville with producer Rick Will. The record includes performances by Lucinda Williams, Sam Bush, Bill Lloyd, and Al Anderson as well as guitarist Rob Gjersoe (Jimmie Dale Gilmore), bassist Lorne Rall, and drummer Dan Massey.

When Geffen disbanded shortly after the release of the record, Fulks found himself without a label, so he started his own company, Boondoggle Records. He released an album of previously unreleased material called The Very Best of Robbie Fulks. He often licenses his music for distribution by Bloodshot.

Output 

2001 saw the release of Couples in Trouble, a dark, brooding, and decidedly non-country album, and 13 Hillbilly Giants, a collection of covers of classic country numbers both obscure and well known. Both records were released by Bloodshot Records. Also in 2001, Fulks was an inaugural member of the judging panel for the Independent Music Awards, which supports independent artists.

Fulks would not release another album until 2005. Georgia Hard on Yep Roc Records shows a return to his county roots. The album was notable for its use of long-time Nashville talent like Lloyd Green, Hank Singer, Dennis Crouch, and Dallas Wayne.

He gained attention for a novelty single he wrote called "Fountains of Wayne Hotline," in which he imagined the power pop band Fountains of Wayne as having a hotline that struggling songwriters could call for help with their song structure.

In April 2007, Fulks released a 2-CD album, Revenge! (also on Yep Roc), mainly of live concert recordings of older songs, but including some new material. One disc, labeled Standing, features a full-band sound, while the second disc, Sitting, consists of Fulks with little or no musical accompaniment. Standing opens with the tongue-in-cheek studio track "We're on the Road", which describes life on tour and simulates a telephone call to Fulks from Yep Roc Records President Glenn Dicker, demanding a new record and denigrating the sales performance of the "path-breaking, not chart-breaking" album Georgia Hard.

In 2009, Fulks self-released a 50-song, alphabetically organized mass of songs via his website, a compilation called 50-Vc. Doberman. Fulks notes that this method, and electronic-only release in general, is not typical of musicians who work in his genre.

In 2010, Fulks released his album Happy: Robbie Fulks Plays the Music of Michael Jackson via Yep Roc Records, in which he covered a group of Jackson's songs as a tribute to the recently deceased musician. He had been working on the record since 2005.

In 2013, Fulks released Gone Away Backward, which was recorded and mixed by Steve Albini. It was released on Bloodshot Records, his first release on that label since 2001's 13 Hillbilly Giants. The album features banjo, mandolin, fiddle, and upright bass. "That's Where I'm From" is a song Fulks cites as being autobiographical. Four songs from 50-Vc. Doberman were the genesis of Gone Away Backward. The title of the record comes from the Book of Isaiah in The Bible.

Gone Away Backward is an acoustic record that goes back to his roots as a musician, Fulks says. He comments that the stylistic choice was a good fit with the musicians who appear on the recording: Robbie Gjersoe, Jenny Scheinman, and Mike Bub. They recorded live, without using any overdubbing or elaborate production, around 25 songs over the course of three days.

In 2014, Fulks joined some members of The Mekons, dubbed "mini-Mekons", on a trip to write and record on the island of Jura in Scotland. The resulting record, Jura, was released in November 2015 and is made up of original songs written on the trip as well as traditional songs.

In April 2016, Fulks released a new record, Upland Stories. The album was nominated for a 2017 Grammy Award for best folk album, while the album's opening track, "Alabama at Night", was nominated for best American roots song.

Musical style 

As a songwriter Fulks is difficult to categorize. Nathan Rabin of A.V. Club says he "has a genius for twisting and subverting country tropes," and "there's more to Fulks than tomfoolery and glibly satirical lyrics." Many of his compositions are silly, funny or spoof songs, such as "Godfrey" ("the sickly, unemployed, amateur children's magician") on the compilation children's album The Bottle Let Me Down, while others are serious country songs.

His music is widely described as either alternative country or folk. Fulks's songwriting often includes humor. Peter Applebome of The New York Times describes his work as "one part artful country, one part artful sendup of country, and one part a little of everything else."

Fulks has an encyclopedic knowledge of country and pop music, and has produced a critically lauded tribute to Johnny Paycheck called Touch My Heart: A Tribute to Johnny Paycheck, which was released by Sugar Hill Records in 2004. He considers himself adventurous, and is always willing to try new things and experiment. "Why not push the envelope and see what you are capable of doing rather than recycle the same old ideas over and over again," he said.

His musicianship has been called "impeccable". Jim Fusilli of the Wall Street Journal suggests that "a world in which Fulks isn't a household name is somehow upside down."

Fulks often plays at The Hideout, a bar and club in Chicago, and has done long-term residencies there. While there, Fulks performs anything from current popular hits to jazz to obscure country masterpieces. He says he rarely performs his own compositions at these shows, preferring to explore other music that has caught his attention at the time.

His live performances feature improvised rearrangements of his original songs, off-the-cuff musical humor, and covers of songs by Michael Jackson, Cher, Shania Twain, and The Bangles, among others.

Fulks has co-written with Dallas Wayne and NRBQ's Al Anderson, to name a few.

Fulks has a long-time association with engineer Steve Albini (Big Black, Shellac).

Personal life 
Fulks has three children, sons Nick, Preston, and Tennessee, and one grandson, Logan. His wife is actress Donna Jay Fulks. Fulks's oldest son, Nick Fulks, and father-in-law, Donald Jerousek, were contestants on season 12 of The Amazing Race. They placed third.

Awards 
 2016: Grammy nomination, Best Folk Album, for Upland Stories 
 2016: Grammy nomination, Best American Roots Song, for "Alabama at Night" on Upland Stories

Discography

Solo records 
1996: Country Love Songs (Bloodshot)
1997: South Mouth (Bloodshot)
1998: Let's Kill Saturday Night (Geffen)
2000: The Very Best of Robbie Fulks (Bloodshot)
2001: Couples in Trouble (Boondoggle)
2001: 13 Hillbilly Giants (Bloodshot)
2004: Live at Double Door 1/16/04 (EMusic Live)
2005: Georgia Hard (Yep Roc)
2007: Revenge! (Yep Roc Records)
2009: 50 Vc. Doberman 50 song digital release (Boondoggle)
2010: Happy: Robbie Fulks Plays the Music of Michael Jackson (Boondoggle)/(Yep Roc)
2013: Gone Away Backward (Bloodshot)
2016: Upland Stories (Bloodshot)
2018: Revenge of the Doberman 53 song digital release (Self-released)
2019: 16 (Bloodshot)

Contributions, collaborations 
 1994: "Cigarette State" – For a Life of Sin: A Compilation of Insurgent Chicago Country (Bloodshot)
 1995: "She Took a Lot of Pills (and Died)" – Hell-Bent: Insurgent Country Volume 2 (Bloodshot)
 1997: "Wedding of the Bugs" (studio version) – Straight Outta Boone County: Cowboy Songs, Home Songs, Western Songs, Mountain Songs (Bloodshot)
 1998: "Across the Alley from the Alamo" – The Pine Valley Cosmonauts Salute the Majesty of Bob Wills: The King of Western Swing (Bloodshot)
 1999: "Call of the Wrecking Ball" – Poor Little Knitter on the Road: A Tribute to The Knitters (Bloodshot)
 2000: "Bloodshot's Turning 5" – Down to the Promised Land: 5 Years of Bloodshot Records (Bloodshot)
 2002: "Godfrey" – The Bottle Let Me Down: Songs for Bumpy Wagon Rides (Bloodshot)
 2004: "Tears at the Grand Ol' Opry" – Hard-Headed Woman: A Celebration of Wanda Jackson (Bloodshot)
 2004: "Shakin' The Blues" (with Gail Davies) – Touch My Heart: a Tribute to Johnny Paycheck (Sugar Hill Records); Fulks produced this record also
 2006: "Browns Ferry Blues" – Old Town School Songbook: Volume One (Bloodshot)
 2006: "Dirty-Mouthed Flo" (live) – Bloodied But Unbowed: Bloodshot Records' Life In The Trenches (DVD) (Bloodshot)
 2006: "Dirty-Mouthed Flo" (live) – Bloodied But Unbowed: The Soundtrack (Bloodshot)
 2014: "Sally G" (Paul McCartney cover) – More Super Hits Of The Seventies (Mike-Shell) WFMU fundraiser CD
 2015: Jura with the mini-Mekons (Bloodshot) – Record Store Day vinyl-only release on Black Friday; subsequently in general release
 2018: Wild! Wild! Wild! with Linda Gail Lewis (Bloodshot)
 2019: "Lonely Ain’t Hardly Alive" - Too Late to Pray: Defiant Chicago Roots (Bloodshot)

References

External links 

 
 
 
 

American alternative country singers
American country singer-songwriters
Singers from Chicago
Living people
1963 births
People from Wilmette, Illinois
Bloodshot Records artists
Country musicians from Illinois
Yep Roc Records artists
Geffen Records artists
Singer-songwriters from Illinois
Columbia College (New York) alumni